Vladimir-Suzdal (Vladimirsko-Suzdal'skaya), also Vladimir-Suzdalian Rus', formally known as the Grand Duchy of Vladimir (1157–1331), was one of the major principalities that succeeded Kievan Rus' in the late 12th century, centered in Vladimir-on-Klyazma. With time the principality grew into a grand duchy divided into several smaller principalities. After being conquered by the Mongol Empire, the principality became a self-governed state headed by its own nobility. A governorship of principality, however, was prescribed by a jarlig (declaration by the Khan) issued from the Golden Horde to a Rurikid sovereign.

Vladimir-Suzdal is traditionally perceived as a cradle of the Great Russian language and nationality; it gradually evolved into the Grand Duchy of Moscow.

Origin

Rostov principality
The first notable administrators in the Rostov region presumably were the sons of Vladimir the Great, Boris and Gleb, and later Yaroslav the Wise. The principality occupied a vast territory in the northeast of Kievan Rus', approximately bounded by the Volga, Oka, and Northern Dvina rivers. According to the archeologist , who specializes in the history of the region, the Rostov land until the 10th century was already under the control of Rostov city, while Sarskoye Gorodishche was a tribal center of the native Merya people.

In the 10th century an eparchy was established in Rostov. One of the first known princes was Yaroslav the Wise and later Boris Vladimirovich. At that time Rostov was the major center of the Eastern Orthodox Christianity in the region dominated mostly by paganism. Until the 11th century Rostov was often associated with the Novgorod. Evidently the spread of Eastern Orthodox Christianity to the lands of the Great Perm was successfully conducted from Rostov. Rostov was the regional capital; other important towns included Suzdal, Yaroslavl, and Belozersk.

Rostov-Suzdal
Vladimir Monomakh, son of the Grand Prince of Vsevolod I, inherited the rights to the principality in 1093. As the Grand Prince of Kiev he appointed his son George I (Yuri Dolgoruky) to rule the northeastern lands and in 1125 moved its capital from Rostov to Suzdal, after which the Principality was referred to as Rostov-Suzdal. During the 11th and 12th centuries when southern parts of Rus' were systematically raided by Turkic nomads, their inhabitants began to migrate northward. In the formerly wooded areas, known as Zalesye, many new settlements were established.

The foundations of Pereslavl, Kostroma, Dmitrov, Moscow, Yuriev-Polsky, Uglich, Tver, Dubna, and many others were assigned (either by chronicle or popular legend) to George, whose sobriquet ("the Long-Armed") alludes to his dexterity in manipulating the politics of far-away Kiev. Sometime in 1108 Monomakh strengthened and rebuilt the town of Vladimir on the Klyazma River, 31 km south of Suzdal. During the rule of George the principality gained military strength, and in the Suzdal-Ryazan war of 1146, it conquered the Ryazan Principality. Later in the 1150s George occupied Kiev a couple of times as well. From that time the lands of the northeastern Rus' played an important role in the politics of Kievan Rus'.

Rise of Vladimir

George's son Andrew the Pious significantly increased Vladimir's power at the expense of the nearby princely states, which he treated with contempt. After burning down Kiev, then the metropolitan seat of Rus', in 1169, he enthroned his younger brother. For Andrew, his capital of Vladimir was a far greater concern, as he embellished it with white stone churches and monasteries. Prince Andrew was murdered by boyars in his suburban residence at Bogolyubovo in 1174.

After a brief interregnum, Andrew's brother Vsevolod III secured the throne. He continued most of his brother's policies and once again subjugated Kiev in 1203. Vsevolod's chief enemies, however, were the Southern Ryazan Principality, which appeared to stir discord in the princely family, and the mighty Turkic state of Volga Bulgaria, which bordered Vladimir-Suzdal to the east. After several military campaigns, Ryazan was burnt to the ground, and the Bulgars were forced to pay tribute.

Vsevolod's death in 1212 precipitated a serious dynastic conflict. His eldest son Konstantin gained the support of powerful Rostovan boyars and Mstislav the Bold of Kiev and expelled the lawful heir, his brother George, from Vladimir to Rostov. George managed to return to the capital six years later, upon Konstantin's death. George proved to be a shrewd ruler who decisively defeated Volga Bulgaria and installed his brother Yaroslav in Novgorod. His reign, however, ended when the Mongol hordes under Batu Khan took and burnt Vladimir in 1238. Thereupon they proceeded to devastate other major cities of Vladimir-Suzdal during the Mongol invasion of Kievan Rus'.

Culture

Suzdalian period 
As part of the Christian world, Rus principalities gained a wide range of opportunities for developing their political and cultural ties not only with Byzantium, but with the European countries, as well. By the end of the eleventh century, Rus gradually fell under the influence of Roman architecture. Whitestone cathedrals, decorated with sculpture, appeared in the principality of Vladimir-Suzdal due to Andrei Bogolyubsky's invitation of architects from "all over the world". According to Russian historian Vasili Tatischev, the architects were sent to Vladimir by the Holy Roman Emperor Frederick Barbarossa. These cathedrals, however, are not identical with the Roman edifices of Catholic Europe and represent a synthesis of the Byzantine cruciform plan and cupolas with Roman whitestone construction and decorative technique. This mixture of Greek and Western European traditions was possible only in Russia. One of its results was a famous architectural masterpiece of Vladimir, the Church of Pokrova na Nerli, a true symbol of cultural originality of Medieval Russia.

In the early Middle Ages, Rus principalities were similar to other European countries culturally and in historical development. Later on, however, Russia and Europe parted ways. The East-West Schism of 1054 was one of the reasons for this. Barely noticeable in the eleventh century, it became very obvious two centuries later during the resistance of the citizens of Novgorod to the Teutonic Knights. Also, by the middle of the twelfth century, the dominating influence of the Kievan Rus’ (some historians do not consider it possible to even call it a state in a modern sense of the word) began to wane. In 1155, Andrei Bogolyubsky practically transferred the seat of the Grand Prince from Kiev to Vladimir, together with the famous Theotokos of Vladimir, an icon of the Virgin Mary. From this time on, almost every principality began forming its own architectural and art schools.

The invasion of Batu Khan and subsequent domination of Russian lands to the Golden Horde was also a turning point in history of Russian culture and statehood.  Mongolian rule imposed its own principles of state on Russia, which were very different from those of Western Europe. In particular, Russia adopted a principle of universal subordination and undivided authority.

Muscovite period 

Rus was only able to recover from the consequences of the Mongolian invasion by the late thirteenth century. The first areas to recover were Novgorod and Pskov, which had been spared the Tatar raids. These city-states, with parliamentarian rule, created an original kind of culture under some influence from their western Baltic neighbors. In the early fourteenth century, leadership in the north-eastern lands was transferred from the Principality of Vladimir to Moscow, which, in turn, would fight for leadership against Tver for another century. Moscow was a part of the Vladimir lands and functioned as one of the border fortresses of north-eastern Russia. In 1324, Metropolitan Peter left Vladimir and settled down in Moscow, thus, transferring the residence of the Russian Orthodox Church (Metropolitan Maximus had moved the residence from Kiev to Vladimir not long before, in 1299). In the late fourteenth century, the principal object of worship of the "old" capital—the icon of the Theotokos of Vladimir—was transferred to Moscow. Vladimir became a model for Muscovy.

Emphasizing the succession, Muscovite princes took good care of Vladimir's sacred places. In the early fifteenth century, Andrei Rublev and Prokhor of Gorodets painted the Assumption (Uspensky) Cathedral. In the mid-1450s, they restored the Cathedral of St. George in Yuriev-Polsky under the supervision of Vasili Dmitriyevich Yermolin. The architecture of Muscovy and its surrounding lands in the fourteenth to early fifteenth centuries, usually referred to as early Muscovite architecture, inherited the technique of whitestone construction and typology of four-pillar cathedrals from Vladimir. Art historians, however, notice that early Muscovite architecture was influenced by the Balkans and European Gothic architecture.

Russian painting of the late fourteenth and early fifteenth centuries is characterized by two major influences, namely those of Byzantine artist Feofan Grek and Russian icon-painter Andrei Rublev. Feofan's style is distinguished by its monochromatic palette and uncommon expressiveness of laconic blots and lines, which send a message of a complex symbolic implication, close to the then widely-spread doctrine of hesychasm, from Byzantium. The soft-colored icons of Rublev are closer to the late Byzantine painting style of the Balkan countries in the fifteenth century.

The late fourteenth century was marked by one of the most important events in Russian history. In 1380, Dmitry Donskoy and his army dealt the first serious blow to the Golden Horde. Sergii Radonezhsky, the founder and hegumen of Troitse-Sergiyev monastery, played an exceptional role in this victory.  The name of Saint Sergii, who became the protector and patron of Muscovy, has an enormous significance in Russian culture. Radonezhsky himself and his followers founded more than two hundred monasteries, which would become the basis for the so-called "monastic colonization" of the little-developed northern lands. The Life of Sergii Radonezhsky was written by one of the outstanding writers of that time, Epifaniy the Wise. Andrei Rublev painted his Trinity, the greatest masterpiece of the Russian Middle Ages, for the cathedral of Sergii's monastery.

Mid-fifteenth-century Russia is known for bloody internecine wars for the Moscow seat of the Grand Prince. Ivan III managed to unite the Russian lands around Moscow (at the cost of ravaging Novgorod and Pskov) only by the end of the fifteenth century, and put an end to Russia's subordination to the Golden Horde after the Great standing on the Ugra river of 1480. The river was later poetically dubbed the "Virgin Belt" (Poyas Bogoroditsy). This event marked the birth of the sovereign Russian state, headed by the Grand Prince of Moscow.

Mongol yoke 

While heavy tribute payments and the initial Mongol invasions did manage to cause much destruction to Vladimir-Suzdal, rule under the Mongols also brought wealth to the region, as Vladimir was able to access the Mongol's lucrative patronage of oriental trade.

None of the cities of the principality managed to regain the power of Kievan Rus' after the Mongol invasion. Vladimir became a vassal of the Mongol Empire, later succeeded by the Golden Horde, with the Grand Prince appointed by the Great Khan. Even the popular Alexander Nevsky of Pereslavl had to go to the Khan's capital in Karakorum in order to be installed as the Grand Prince in Vladimir. As many factions strove for power, the principality rapidly disintegrated into eleven tiny states: Moscow, Tver, Pereslavl, Rostov, Yaroslavl, Uglich, Belozersk, Kostroma, Nizhny Novgorod, Starodub-upon-Klyazma, and Yuriev-Polsky. All of them nominally acknowledged the suzerainty of the Grand Prince of Vladimir, but his effective authority became progressively weaker.

By the end of the century, only three cities — Moscow, Tver, and Nizhny Novgorod — still contended for the title of Grand Prince of Vladimir. Once installed, however, they chose to remain in their own cities rather than moving to Vladimir. The Grand Duchy of Moscow gradually came to eclipse its rivals. When the metropolitan of Kievan Rus' moved his chair from Vladimir to Moscow in 1325, it became clear that Moscow had effectively succeeded Vladimir as the chief centre of power in the north-east remnant of Kievan Rus'.

See also 
Darughachi
 Grand Duke of Vladimir
List of early East Slavic states
Zalesye

References

Further reading 

 William Craft Brumfield. A History of Russian Architecture (Cambridge: Cambridge University Press, 1993)  (Chapter Three: "Vladimir and Suzdal Before the Mongol Invasion")

External links
  History of Vladimir-Suzdal Principality in the Grand Soviet Encyclopedia

 
Former monarchies of Europe
Former principalities
Vladimir Oblast 
Medieval Russia
Subdivisions of Kievan Rus'
Former countries
Vassal and tributary states of the Golden Horde